Kendal Carson Smith (born November 23, 1965) is a former American football wide receiver who played two seasons with the Cincinnati Bengals of the National Football League. He was drafted by the Cincinnati Bengals in the seventh round of the 1989 NFL Draft. He played college football at Utah State University and attended Mountain View High School in Mountain View, California.

References

External links
Just Sports Stats

Living people
1965 births
Players of American football from California
Sportspeople from the San Francisco Bay Area
American football wide receivers
Utah State Aggies football players
Cincinnati Bengals players
People from San Mateo, California
Mountain View High School alumni